Mohamed Hamid Hazzaz (30 November 1945 – 13 January 2018), also known as Hamid El-Hazzaz, was a Moroccan football goalkeeper.

International career 
Hazzaz represented Morocco in the 1970 FIFA World Cup where he played Morocco's final group match against Bulgaria. The match finished in a 1–1 draw. Morocco therefore became the first African side to avoid defeat in the World Cup. He also played for MAS Fez. Hazzaz represented Morocco at the 1972 Summer Olympics in Munich.

References

External links

1945 births
2018 deaths
Moroccan footballers
Morocco international footballers
Association football goalkeepers
Maghreb de Fès players
Botola players
1970 FIFA World Cup players
Footballers at the 1972 Summer Olympics
Olympic footballers of Morocco
1976 African Cup of Nations players
1978 African Cup of Nations players
People from Fez, Morocco
Africa Cup of Nations-winning players